Hatyai University   is a private university in Hat Yai, Songkhla Province, Thailand. Founded in 1997, the university offers undergraduate programs through its seven faculties: business administration, law, education and liberal arts, science and technology, political science, communication arts, and Didyasarin International College. Its graduate school offers in education administration, business administration programs, and doctoral programs.

History
Hatyai University was the first private university in southern Thailand. It was previously named Hatyai City College and was established on 9 April 1997 by Madam Praneet Didyasarin, the founder and the licensee of Hatyai Amnuaywit School Group. The Ministry of University Education Affairs promoted Hatyai City College to university status on 30 May 2003. 

Hatyai University first became a college on 9 April 1997. with the inaugural ceremony held on 20 April 1999. On 4 June 2003, it became a university. The institutional status was officially changed from Hatyai City College to Hatyai University.

1997
 Establishment of Hatyai City College and the first faculty was Faculty of Business Management offered one curriculum, Bachelor of Business Administration (BBA.) (four year program) in three fields: management, accounting, and marketing.  
 There were 182 students 
 The first strategic plan for university development was set up for 1997-2001

1998
 Faculty of Business Management offered a two-year program with one curriculum: Bachelor of Business Administration (BBA) in three fields: management, accounting, and marketing.  
 847 students (increased 665 students from 1997).

1999
 Official Foundation Ceremony of Hatyai City College was conducted on 20 February 1999 by the former Prime Minister, Mr. Chuan Leekpai.  
 The Faculty of Business Management offered two fields (two and four year programs): Business Computer and Human Resources Management.  
 1,808 students (increased 961 students from 1998).

2000
 The Faculty of Law was founded to offer the a curriculum, Bachelor of Laws (LLB.)  
 HU first graduation ceremony was held for students who graduated from the Continuing program in the Faculty of Business Management.  
 2,417 students (increased 609 students from 1999).

2001
 The Faculty of Liberal Arts was founded to offer the new curriculum: Bachelor of Arts (BA) in Business English program (four year program).  
 The Graduate School was founded to offer a new curriculum, Master of Education (MEd) in one field, educational administration.  
 3,205 students (increased 788 students from 2000).  
 Memorandum of Understanding Signing Ceremony was conducted between Universiti Utara Malaysia and Hatyai University. 
 Official Signing Agreement of Establishment of Authorized Sun Education Center (ASEC) was conducted between Microsystems and Hatyai University. It is the first center in southern Thailand for producing Java programmers. 
 Implementation plan of the quality assurance was set up. 
 Implementation plan of the university development was set up for the second period (2002-2007).

2002
 Faculty of Science and Technology was founded to offer the new curriculum; Bachelor of Science (B.Sc.) (four year program) in one field, information technology.  
 3,651 students (increased 446 students from 2001). 
 Joint hosted with the National Education Committee and Universiti Utara Malaysia for the International Conference on the Challenge of Learning and Teaching in a Brave New World (CoLT 2002). Over 200 administrators and academic officers from 22 countries participated in the conference.

2003
 Hatyai City College became Hatyai University. 
 4,138 students (increased 487 students from 2002).

HU identity
HU's emblem is the shield with the title of HU underneath and a torch on top. Inside the shield, are a Ma Hat Tree, book, and the wheel of life.

Programs

Bachelor's Degrees
Two and four year programs in

International Program
 Bachelor of Education in English (five year International Program) 
 Bachelor of Business Administration in International Business Management 
 Bachelor of Arts in Business Chinese (Bilingual Program)
 Bachelor of Arts in Tourism Industry (Airline Business) (Bilingual Program)

Master's degrees
 M.Ed. (Curriculum and Instruction) Master of Education Program in Curriculum and Instruction
 M.Ed. (Educational Administration) Master of Education Program in Educational Administration
 M.P.A. Master of Public Administration Program in Public and Private Management
 Master of Business Administration Program
 Graduate Diploma in Teaching Profession Program

Doctoral degrees
 Doctor of Philosophy in Business Administration
 Doctor of Education in Educational Administration

Facilities

Student services

Academic collaboration

Thailand
 Central Retail
 CPF Trading
 Thailand Convention & Exhibition Bureau
 Darunsartwittaya School
 Assumption University

International collaboration

Malaysia
 ADAM College
 Equator Academy of Art
 HELP University
 Erican College
 Limkokwing University
 Universiti Utara Malaysia (UUM)
 Universiti Sains Malaysia (USM)
 Universiti  Teknologi MARA (UiTM) 
 Universiti Malaysia Perlis (UniMAP)

China
 Beijing Geely University
 Guangxi Normal University
 Henan Normal University
 Liuzhou City Vocational College
 University of Sanya
 Yunnan University
 Yunnan College of Foreign Affairs and Foreign Languages 
 Yunnan Normal University

Indonesia
 Akademi Manajemen Administrasi Yogyakarta
 Akademi Manajemen Administrasi YPK
 Akademi Keperawatan 17 Karanganyar Surakarta
 Ahmad Dahlan University
 Duta Wacana Christian University
 Perkumpulan Ahli Dan Dosen Republik Indonesia (ADRI)
 Universitas Kuningan
 Universitas Muria Kudus (UMK)
 Universitas Maarif Hasyim Latif
 Universitas Pancasakti Tegal
 Sekolah Tinggi Ilmu Ekonomi (STIE) Atama Bhakti
 Sekolah Tinggi Ilmu Ekonomi (STIE) Totalwin
 Sekolah Tinggi Ilmu Kesehatan (STIKES) Kendal
 Sekolah Tinggi Ilmu Ekonomi (STIE) YPK

See also
 List of universities in Thailand

References

Private universities and colleges in Thailand
Songkhla province
Educational institutions established in 1997
1997 establishments in Thailand